The Graceful Fallen Mango is an album by Dave Longstreth. The album is a collection of tunes recorded in Longstreth's bedroom on a 4-track machine and in his brother's basement on a computer. Dave Longstreth plays everything on the album save for some back-up vocals on two tracks, which were sung by his brother Jake and a person only identified as Steve in the liner notes. Musically, the songs range from straightforward acoustic tunes, to hard rock songs and experimental instrumentals. A small discrepancy in the title of the album exists, since the graceful-fallen mango is written on one side of the CD's spine and THE GRACEFUL FALLEN MANGO is written on the other. Western Vinyl shows the title as the latter, following normal capitalization rules.

Track listing

References 

2002 debut albums
Dirty Projectors albums
Albums produced by David Longstreth